HDMS Diana is the first of six vessels in the Diana-class built to patrol in the Danish territorial waters. The ship is named after the Roman goddess of the hunt. Diana, like all her sister ships, was built in Faaborg yard.

The ship was built to replace the aging Barsø class, which had become obsolete. The ship is equipped with a single Stan Flex container position, but is unable to accommodate all types of containers due to configuration issues. The position is primarily used for environmental projects and will utilize either a storage module or an anti-pollution module. Diana carries a water-jet propelled RHIB which is placed on a slide aft and can be hoisted and taken in almost any weather. The vessels are approved for operation in 10 cm ice.

The ships are designed to perform tasks such as monitoring and maritime policing, peacekeeping, search and rescue including preparedness for decompression sickness, environmental (pollution control) and acute explosive ordnance disposal, including the clearance of gas and ammunition.

References 

2006 ships
Diana-class patrol vessels
Ships built in Denmark